In cell biology, an organelle is a specialized subunit, usually within a cell, that has a specific function. The name organelle comes from the idea that these structures are parts of cells, as organs are to the body, hence organelle, the suffix -elle being a diminutive. Organelles are either separately enclosed within their own lipid bilayers (also called membrane-bound organelles) or are spatially distinct functional units without a surrounding lipid bilayer (non-membrane bound organelles). Although most organelles are functional units within cells, some function units that extend outside of cells are often termed organelles, such as cilia, the flagellum and archaellum, and the trichocyst.

Organelles are identified by microscopy, and can also be purified by cell fractionation. There are many types of organelles, particularly in eukaryotic cells. They include structures that make up the endomembrane system (such as the nuclear envelope, endoplasmic reticulum, and Golgi apparatus), and other structures such as mitochondria and plastids. While prokaryotes do not possess eukaryotic organelles, some do contain protein-shelled bacterial microcompartments, which are thought to act as primitive prokaryotic organelles; and there is also evidence of other membrane-bounded structures. Also, the prokaryotic flagellum which protrudes outside the cell, and its motor, as well as the largely extracellular pilus, are often spoken of as organelles.

History and terminology 

In biology organs are defined as confined functional units within an organism. The analogy of bodily organs to microscopic cellular substructures is obvious, as from even early works, authors of respective textbooks rarely elaborate on the distinction between the two.

In the 1830s, Félix Dujardin refuted Ehrenberg theory which said that microorganisms have the same organs of multicellular animals, only minor.

Credited as the first to use a diminutive of organ (i.e., little organ) for cellular structures was German zoologist Karl August Möbius (1884), who used the term organula (plural of organulum, the diminutive of Latin organum). In a footnote, which was published as a correction in the next issue of the journal, he justified his suggestion to call organs of unicellular organisms "organella" since they are only differently formed parts of one cell, in contrast to multicellular organs of multicellular organisms.

Types 
While most cell biologists consider the term organelle to be synonymous with cell compartment, a space often bound by one or two lipid bilayers, some cell biologists choose to limit the term to include only those cell compartments that contain deoxyribonucleic acid (DNA), having originated from formerly autonomous microscopic organisms acquired via endosymbiosis.

The first, broader conception of organelles is that they are membrane-bound structures. However, even by using this definition, some parts of the cell that have been shown to be distinct functional units do not qualify as organelles.  Therefore, the use of organelle to also refer to non-membrane bound structures such as ribosomes is common and accepted. This has led many texts to delineate between membrane-bound and non-membrane bound organelles. The non-membrane bound organelles, also called large biomolecular complexes, are large assemblies of macromolecules that carry out particular and specialized functions, but they lack membrane boundaries.  Many of these are referred to as "proteinaceous organelles" as their main structure is made of proteins. Such cell structures include:
 large RNA and protein complexes: ribosome, spliceosome, vault
 large protein complexes: proteasome, DNA polymerase III holoenzyme, RNA polymerase II holoenzyme, symmetric viral capsids, complex of GroEL and GroES; membrane protein complexes: porosome, photosystem I, ATP synthase
 large DNA and protein complexes: nucleosome
 centriole and microtubule-organizing center (MTOC)
 cytoskeleton
 flagellum
 nucleolus
 stress granule
 germ cell granule
 neuronal transport granule

The mechanisms by which such non-membrane bound organelles form and retain their spatial integrity have been likened to liquid-liquid phase separation.

The second, more restrictive definition of organelle includes only those cell compartments that contain deoxyribonucleic acid (DNA), having originated from formerly autonomous microscopic organisms acquired via endosymbiosis.

Using this definition, there would only be two broad classes of organelles (i.e. those that contain their own DNA, and have originated from endosymbiotic bacteria):
 mitochondria (in almost all eukaryotes)
 plastids (e.g. in plants, algae, and some protists).

Other organelles are also suggested to have endosymbiotic origins, but do not contain their own DNA (notably the flagellum – see evolution of flagella).

Eukaryotic organelles 
Eukaryotic cells are structurally complex, and by definition are organized, in part, by interior compartments that are themselves enclosed by lipid membranes that resemble the outermost cell membrane. The larger organelles, such as the nucleus and vacuoles, are easily visible with the light microscope. They were among the first biological discoveries made after the invention of the microscope.

Not all eukaryotic cells have each of the organelles listed below. Exceptional organisms have cells that do not include some organelles that might otherwise be considered universal to eukaryotes (such as mitochondria). There are also occasional exceptions to the number of membranes surrounding organelles, listed in the tables below (e.g., some that are listed as double-membrane are sometimes found with single or triple membranes). In addition, the number of individual organelles of each type found in a given cell varies depending upon the function of that cell.

Mitochondria and plastids, including chloroplasts, have double membranes and their own DNA. According to the endosymbiotic theory, they are believed to have originated from incompletely consumed or invading prokaryotic organisms.

Other related structures:
 cytosol
 endomembrane system
 nucleosome
 microtubule

Prokaryotic organelles 

Prokaryotes are not as structurally complex as eukaryotes, and were once thought as having little internal organization, and lack cellular compartments and internal membranes; but slowly, details are emerging about prokaryotic internal structures that overturn these assumptions. An early false turn was the idea developed in the 1970s that bacteria might contain cell membrane folds termed mesosomes, but these were later shown to be artifacts produced by the chemicals used to prepare the cells for electron microscopy.

However, there is increasing evidence of compartmentalization in at least some prokaryotes. Recent research has revealed that at least some prokaryotes have microcompartments, such as carboxysomes. These subcellular compartments are 100–200 nm in diameter and are enclosed by a shell of proteins. Even more striking is the description of membrane-bound magnetosomes in bacteria, reported in 2006.

The bacterial phylum Planctomycetota has revealed a number of compartmentalization features. The Planctomycetota cell plan includes intracytoplasmic membranes that separates the cytoplasm into paryphoplasm (an outer ribosome-free space) and pirellulosome (or riboplasm, an inner ribosome-containing space). Membrane-bound anammoxosomes have been discovered in five Planctomycetota "anammox" genera, which perform anaerobic ammonium oxidation. In the Planctomycetota species Gemmata obscuriglobus, a nucleus-like structure surrounded by lipid membranes has been reported.

Compartmentalization is a feature of prokaryotic photosynthetic structures. Purple bacteria have "chromatophores", which are reaction centers found in invaginations of the cell membrane. Green sulfur bacteria have chlorosomes, which are photosynthetic antenna complexes found bonded to cell membranes. Cyanobacteria have internal thylakoid membranes for light-dependent photosynthesis; studies have revealed that the cell membrane and the thylakoid membranes are not continuous with each other.

See also 
 CoRR hypothesis
 Ejectosome
 Endosymbiotic theory
 Organelle biogenesis
 Membrane vesicle trafficking
 Host-pathogen interface
 Vesiculo-vacuolar organelle

References

External links 

 
 Tree of Life project: Eukaryotes
 Organelle Databases

 
Cell anatomy